The Coast Is Clear may refer to:

The Coast Is Clear (In-Flight Safety album)
The Coast Is Clear (Tracy Lawrence album), or its title track
"Coast Is Clear", a song by Skrillex featuring Chance The Rapper and The Social Experiment from Recess
 Coast Is Clear , 2022 album by American rock band Outline in Color